Alex Reymundo is a Mexican-American comedian and actor who was featured on the 2007 ALMA Awards.

Filmography 
Film
 2002 The Movement, a television movie, as Officer Torez
 2003  El matador, as Juan Carlos, Sr.
 2007  Permanent Vacation, as Alex Garcia

Television
 2010  Latino 101, as himself

Video games
 2006 Cars, voice actor

Stand up
 2002 The Original Latin Kings of Comedy, as himself
 2007  Hick-Spanic: Live in Albuquerque, as himself
2007  The Payaso Comedy Slam, as himself, Host, and Producer
 2009  Red-Nexican, as himself
 2011  Ron White's Salute to the Troops, as himself

References

External links 
 
 
 Biography at abclocal.go.com

Year of birth missing (living people)
Living people
American male film actors
American stand-up comedians
People from Acapulco
American male television actors
Hispanic and Latino American male actors
Mexican emigrants to the United States
21st-century American comedians
Comedians from Kentucky